Ifold is a hamlet in West Sussex and part of the civil Parish of Plaistow, of which it is the largest settlement. Ifold is classified as a hamlet, because there is a Church, school or pub 
. Ifold has a settlement boundary and for decades has had new housing development. Ifold as it is today arose from historic Ifold Estate with its manor house, Ifold House built in 1802 on the site of an original and demolished in 1936. During WWII plots of land were sold, originally to people who used them to build holiday or weekend homes.

Ifold has a community centre, Kelsey Hall. Originally a garage dating back to 1948, it has since been rebuilt and extended in the 1990s with the help of a lottery grant. The hall hosts a number of weekly user groups.

There is also a Scout Association which has Beavers, Cubs, Scouts, Brownies, Guides and Explorer Scouts. The Scout hut serves Ifold and the surrounding villages.

History
The Ifold Estate was first divided into plots of land in the 1930s. Until around 1953 there was no mains water supply.

Transport
Ifold lies on the 44 bus route of Arriva Bus  and route 64 of the Compass Bus Company.

References

External links

Hamlets in West Sussex
Chichester District